XHXP-FM is a radio station on 106.5 FM in Tuxtepec, Oaxaca. It carries the La Mejor grupera format from MVS Radio.

History
XEXP-AM 1200 received its concession on August 27, 1964. It was owned by Ricardo Moreno Flores and broadcast as a daytimer with 250 watts, soon increased to 500 watts on 1150 kHz. Bravo Rodríguez acquired XEXP in 1977.

XEXP moved to 106.5 FM after obtaining approval to migrate to FM in 2010.

References

Radio stations in Oaxaca